Annette Carlén-Karlsson (born 2 August 1956) is a Swedish speed skater. She competed at the 1980 Winter Olympics and the 1984 Winter Olympics.

References

External links
 

1956 births
Living people
Swedish female speed skaters
Olympic speed skaters of Sweden
Speed skaters at the 1980 Winter Olympics
Speed skaters at the 1984 Winter Olympics
People from Kristinehamn
Sportspeople from Värmland County